Weixin County is a county in the northeast of Yunnan Province, China, bordering Sichuan Province to the north. It is under the administration the prefecture-level city of Zhaotong.

Administrative divisions
Weixin County has 7 towns, 2 townships and 1 ethnic township. 
7 towns

2 townships
 Gaotian
 Santao
1 ethnic township
 Shuanghe Miao and Yi

Gallery

Climate

References

External links

Weixin County Official Website

County-level divisions of Zhaotong